Goldsboro Historic District is a national historic district located at Goldsboro in York County, Pennsylvania. The district includes 79 contributing buildings in the central business district and surrounding residential area of Goldsboro. Most of the buildings date between 1850 and 1930, with some notable Greek Revival style buildings. The houses are mostly small, -story, vernacular wood frame dwellings.

It was listed on the National Register of Historic Places in 1984.

References 

Historic districts on the National Register of Historic Places in Pennsylvania
Greek Revival architecture in Pennsylvania
Historic districts in York County, Pennsylvania
National Register of Historic Places in York County, Pennsylvania